In Greek mythology, Pandora (derived from  "all" and  "gift", thus "all-gifted" or "all-giving") was Phthian princess as the daughter of King Deucalion of Thessaly. She was named after her maternal grandmother, the more famous Pandora.

Biography 
Pandora's mother was Pyrrha, daughter of Epimetheus and Pandora. She was the sister of Hellen and Thyia. Her other possible siblings were Amphictyon, Protogeneia, Melantho (Melantheia) and Candybus.

According to the Hesiodic Catalogue of Women, Pandora was the mother of Graecus by the god Zeus. The same parentage can be attributed to Latinus. In some accounts, Pandora's children by Zeus were called Melera and Pandorus.

Notes

References 
 Gantz, Timothy, Early Greek Myth: A Guide to Literary and Artistic Sources, Johns Hopkins University Press, 1996, Two volumes:  (Vol. 1),  (Vol. 2).
Hesiod, Catalogue of Women from Homeric Hymns, Epic Cycle, Homerica translated by Evelyn-White, H G. Loeb Classical Library Volume 57. London: William Heinemann, 1914. Online version at theoi.com
 Pseudo-Clement, Recognitions from Ante-Nicene Library Volume 8, translated by Smith, Rev. Thomas. T. & T. Clark, Edinburgh. 1867. Online version at theoi.com

Princesses in Greek mythology
Deucalionids
Mortal women of Zeus
Thessalian characters in Greek mythology
Thessalian mythology